Saudi Arabian–Swedish relations are the bilateral relations between the Kingdom of Saudi Arabia and the Kingdom of Sweden.

Relations
Saudi Arabia and Sweden began establishing relations during the mid-20th century, when Sweden and Saudi Arabia both committed to neutrality throughout World War II. Both countries share a similar system of monarchy, albeit Sweden is a constitutional monarchy while Saudi Arabia is a totalitarian absolute monarchy.

2015 human rights spat
In 2015, Saudi Arabia and Sweden embroiled in a political fallout when Sweden criticized Saudi Arabia over human rights records after Swedish Foreign Minister Margot Wallström accused Saudi Arabia of maltreating Saudi blogger Raif Badawi. In response, Saudi Arabia and Sweden withdrew ambassadors from each other's capitals and Sweden tore down a military deal with Saudi Arabia. A year later, Saudi Arabia and Sweden resumed diplomatic relations after a series of mission from Sweden to Saudi Arabia.

Jamal Khashoggi's death
Sweden had refused to comment about the murder of Saudi journalist Jamal Khashoggi and remained committed to continue selling weapons to Saudi Arabia. Previously, Sweden had scrapped arm sales for Saudi Arabia.

Yemeni War
Sweden has been criticized for being complicit in the ongoing Yemeni Civil War whereas Swedish weapons were found to be frequently used by the Armed Forces of Saudi Arabia to commit atrocities, previously these weapons were used to quell down protests in Bahrain.

In response, Sweden had sought to reaffirm its commitment for peace process in Yemen. In December 2018, a Sweden-brokered agreement was signed in Swedish capital Stockholm between Saudi-backed Yemeni government and the Houthis.

Lethal weapon selling
Saudi Arabia, alongside the United Arab Emirates, is the largest buyer of Swedish weapons despite Sweden's size of population.

Diplomatic missions
Saudi Arabia has an embassy in Stockholm while Sweden has an embassy in Riyadh.

See also 
Foreign relations of Saudi Arabia 
Foreign relations of Sweden
List of ambassadors of Sweden to Saudi Arabia

References

 
Sweden
Saudi Arabia